Haimbachia cochisensis is a moth in the family Crambidae. It was described by Hahn William Capps in 1965. It is found in North America, where it has been recorded from Arizona.

References

Haimbachiini
Moths described in 1965